Note-oriety is the self-titled album released by collegiate a cappella group Note-oriety of James Madison University in 2015. It is the group's seventh studio album.

Track listing 
 Bang Bang by Jessie J, Ariana Grande, and Nicki Minaj
 Lies by Marina and the Diamonds
 Stay/What Now (Mashup) by Rihanna
 Pretty Hurts by Beyoncé
 Somethin' Bad by Miranda Lambert
 Just a Game by Birdy 
 Not Ready to Make Nice by Dixie Chicks
 Blown Away by Carrie Underwood
 Settle Down by kimbra
 A Little Party Never Killed Nobody (All We Got) by Fergie (singer)
 My Heart With You by The Rescues

Awards

Musical Awards

Contemporary A Cappella Recording Awards (CARAs)

Recorded A Cappella Review Board (RARB)

Selection for "Best of" Compilation Albums

"Pretty Hurts" music video 
Note-oriety released a music video along with the album, featuring their cover of "Pretty Hurts" by Beyoncé. The music video cover went viral almost immediately, and currently has over 500,000 views on YouTube. The video was featured in HuffPost, USA Today, and BuzzFeed, among others. The video was praised by Nicki Minaj on her official Facebook page.

References 

2015 albums